The 2020 Boyd Gaming 300 was a NASCAR Xfinity Series race held between February 22, 2020 and February 23, 2020 at Las Vegas Motor Speedway in Las Vegas, NV. It was contested over 200 laps on the  asphalt intermediate speedway. It was the second race of the 2020 NASCAR Xfinity Series season. Stewart-Haas Racing's Chase Briscoe took home his first victory of the season.

The race began on February 22, but was suspended due to rain after the end of stage 1. It was resumed at 7:50 ET on February 23 after the conclusion of the Cup Series race.

Report

Background 
Las Vegas Motor Speedway, located in Clark County, Nevada outside the Las Vegas city limits and about 15 miles northeast of the Las Vegas Strip, is a 1,200-acre (490 ha) complex of multiple tracks for motorsports racing. The complex is owned by Speedway Motorsports, Inc., which is headquartered in Charlotte, North Carolina.

Entry list 

 (R) denotes rookie driver.
 (i) denotes driver who is ineligible for series driver points.

Practice

Final Practice 

Qualifying 
Qualifying for Saturday was cancelled due to rain and Myatt Snider was awarded the pole by virtue of the final 2019 owner points standings.

Starting Lineup 

 Polesitter Myatt Snider started from the rear after going to a backup car.
 Joe Nemechek started from the rear after missing driver intros.

Race

Race results

Stage Results 
Stage One

Laps: 45

Stage Two

Laps: 45

Final Stage Results 

Laps: 123

Race statistics 

 Lead changes: 17 among 7 different drivers
 Cautions/Laps: 5 for 28
 Red flags: 0
 Time of race: 2 hours, 19 minutes, and 44 seconds
 Average speed:

Media

Television 
The Boyd Gaming 300 was carried by FS1 in the United States on Saturday (Feb. 22), and resumed on FS2 on Sunday (Feb. 23). Adam Alexander, Richard Childress Racing Driver Austin Dillon, and Michael Waltrip called the race from the booth, with Matt Yocum and Jamie Little covering pit road.

Radio 
The Performance Racing Network (PRN) called the race for radio, which was simulcast on SiriusXM NASCAR Radio.

Standings after the race 

 Drivers' Championship standings

Note: Only the first 12 positions are included for the driver standings.

References 

NASCAR races at Las Vegas Motor Speedway

2020 NASCAR Xfinity Series
2020 in sports in Nevada
February 2020 sports events in the United States